Kavita Rahut (née Raut, born 5 May 1985) is an Indian long-distance runner from Nashik, Maharashtra. She holds the current national record for 10 km road running with a timing of 34:32  as well as the current national record in the half marathon with a timing of 1:12:50. She won the bronze medal in 10,000 metres race at the 2010 Commonwealth Games, the first individual track medal by an Indian woman athlete at the Commonwealth Games. She also won the silver medal in 10,000 metres race at the 2010 Asian Games.

Biography
Kavita Raut was born in a tribal family on 5 May 1985 in Sawarpada, a village near Harsul, Nashik in Maharashtra state, India. She is employed with Oil and Natural Gas Corporation (ONGC) and is married to Mahesh Tungar.she is known as 'Savarpada Express'.

Career
Raut won a bronze medal at the 2009 Asian athletics championships held at Guangzhou, China. She won another bronze medal in the 10,000 metres race at the 2010 Commonwealth Games held at New Delhi on 8 October 2010 with a timing of 33:05.28. The medal was the first individual track medal by an Indian athlete at the Commonwealth Games in more than 50 years, after Milkha Singh's 440 yards gold at the 1958 Cardiff Commonwealth Games. It was also the first individual track medal by an Indian woman athlete in the history of Commonwealth Games.

She also won the silver medal in the 10,000 metres race at the 2010 Asian Games held at Guangzhou, China on 21 November 2010 with a timing of 31:51.44, which is her personal best. The medal was a double victory for India, as Preeja Sreedharan won the gold in the same event with a timing of 31:50.47 setting a record for India's best.

She started the following season with a 5000/10,000 m double at the 2011 National Games of India, setting Games records in both events.

Tungar holds the current Indian National record for 10 km road running with a mark of 34:32, set at the Sunfeast World 10K in Bangalore. She is a recipient of Arjuna Award.

Tungar received the Arjuna Award in 2012 and the Suvarnaratna Award in 2015.

References

External links

 Kavita Raut at Facebook

Living people
1985 births
Indian female long-distance runners
21st-century Indian women
21st-century Indian people
People from Nashik
Commonwealth Games bronze medallists for India
Sportswomen from Maharashtra
Athletes (track and field) at the 2010 Commonwealth Games
Asian Games medalists in athletics (track and field)
Recipients of the Arjuna Award
Athletes (track and field) at the 2010 Asian Games
Asian Games silver medalists for India
Asian Games bronze medalists for India
Athletes (track and field) at the 2016 Summer Olympics
Olympic athletes of India
Commonwealth Games medallists in athletics
Medalists at the 2010 Asian Games
Athletes from Maharashtra
South Asian Games gold medalists for India
South Asian Games medalists in athletics
Medallists at the 2010 Commonwealth Games